Boulevard des Capucines is an oil on canvas street scene painting of the famous Paris boulevard by French Impressionist artist Claude Monet created in 1873.

History
From the late 1860s, Monet and other like-minded artists, met with rejection from the conservative Académie des Beaux-Arts which held its annual exhibition at the Salon de Paris. During the latter part of 1873, Monet, Renoir, Pissarro, and Sisley organized the Société anonyme des artistes peintres, sculpteurs et graveurs to exhibit their artworks independently. At their first exhibition, held in April 1874, Monet exhibited the work that was to give the group its lasting name, Impression, Sunrise. Among the works Monet included in the first Impressionist exhibition was The Luncheon, 1868, which features Camille Doncieux and Jean Monet. The painting was rejected by the Paris Salon of 1870.

Also in this exhibition was a painting titled Boulevard des Capucines, a painting of the boulevard done from the photographer Nadar's apartment at no. 35. Monet painted the subject twice and it is uncertain which of the two pictures, the one now in the Pushkin Museum in Moscow, or that at the Nelson-Atkins Museum of Art in Kansas City (shown here) was the painting that appeared in the groundbreaking 1874 exhibition, though more recently the Moscow picture has been favoured.

See also
List of paintings by Claude Monet

References

External links
 Impressionism: a centenary exhibition, an exhibition catalog from The Metropolitan Museum of Art (fully available online as PDF), which contains material on this painting (p. 159-163)

 At the Nelson-Atkins Museum of Art 

1873 paintings
Paintings by Claude Monet
Paintings in the collection of the Nelson-Atkins Museum of Art